Hannah Dunn (born 19 August 1991) is an Australian rules footballer playing for Port Adelaide in the AFL Women's competition.

Early life
Dunn was raised in Canberra and attended Daramalan College throughout her upbringing. She began playing football in 2010 for the Queanbeyan Tigerettes in the AFL Canberra competition and became the first female player to reach 100 appearances for the club.

AFLW career
Despite missing out on selection in the 2016 AFL Women's draft, Dunn trained with Greater Western Sydney as a back-up player in 2016 preseason period. It was her only match for the Giants and she was delisted at the end of the 2017 season. Dunn was drafted to the Gold Coast Suns with pick 22 in the 2019 AFL Women's draft and played six AFLW matches for the club in 2020. She was named co-captain of the club in January 2021, and sole captain the following season. On 26 May 2022, Dunn announced her signing with the new AFLW expansion team Port Adelaide.

References

External links 

1991 births
Living people
Sportspeople from Canberra
Greater Western Sydney Giants (AFLW) players
Australian rules footballers from the Australian Capital Territory
Gold Coast Football Club (AFLW) players